Anil Kumar Singh (born 4 March 1985) is an Indian track and field athlete from Haryana who specializes in javelin throw. He is the first Indian athlete to breach the 80-metre barrier in a competition. Anil Singh holds the current Indian National record of 80.72 metre set at the Asian All Stars athletics championships held in Bhopal on 18 September 2008. He replaced Satbir Singh's decade-old record of 79.68 metres, registered in Kolkata in October 1998.

References

External links

1985 births
Indian male javelin throwers
People from Bhiwani
Living people
Athletes from Haryana